Press Communications Radio, LLC is a broadcasting company in the American state of New Jersey which owns six radio stations.  The company is owned by Robert E. McAllan, and is a sister entity to PMCM TV, LLC.  It traces its roots back to 1895, and entered radio broadcasting in 1947 by launching the first FM station entirely in the Garden State, WBAB-FM in Atlantic City, New Jersey (at the time, owned by its subsidiary, Press-Union Newspapers), simulcasting WBAB, later falling silent.  While no longer in the newspaper business, the company has a formal business partnership with the Gannett-owned Asbury Park Press.

PMCM TV 
PMCM TV, LLC was founded in 2008 in Wall Township, New Jersey to purchase KJWY from Sunbelt Communications Company and KVNV from Valley Broadcasting Company.  After the sale closed in 2009, the stations were moved to Wilmington, Delaware (to serve the Philadelphia market) and Middletown Township, New Jersey (to serve the New York City market) respectively and resumed broadcasting in 2013. The Wilmington station, which PMCM renamed KJWP, was sold to Maranatha Broadcasting Company in 2017, and the Middletown Township which PMCM renamed WJLP, was sold to Weigel Broadcasting in 2022.

Broadcasting

Radio stations 

Formerly owned stations:

Television stations

See also 
 Me-TV
 CBS Radio

References

External links 
 http://www.presscommradio.com
 http://www.pmcmtv.com

Mass media companies of the United States
Television broadcasting companies of the United States
Radio broadcasting companies of the United States